Daniel Templeton was a Scottish amateur footballer who played as an inside forward in the Scottish League for Queen's Park, Ayr United and Partick Thistle.

Personal life 
Templeton worked as a clerk. He served as an Air Mechanic 2nd Class in the Royal Air Force during the First World War.

Career statistics

References

1897 births
Scottish footballers
Scottish Football League players
Association football inside forwards
Queen's Park F.C. players
Royal Air Force personnel of World War I
Place of death missing
Year of death missing
Partick Thistle F.C. players
Ayr United F.C. players
Footballers from Glasgow